Octurothrips is a genus of thrips in the family Phlaeothripidae, first described by Hermann Priesner in 1931. There is just one species in this genus: Octurothrips pulcher.

This genus and species has unusually long abdominal segments IX and X. It shares many of the characters of Habrothrips, but its head and antennae are very different.

Distribution and habitat 
It has been found in Victoria, South Australia and Queensland in inland arid zones, by beating the stems of various Acacias. It is thought to feed on fungus.

Further reading

References 

Phlaeothripidae
Thrips
Thrips genera
Insects described in 1931
Taxa named by Hermann Priesner